Gill Airways was a regional airline with its head office in New Aviation House on the grounds of Newcastle Airport in Newcastle-upon-Tyne, England, United Kingdom.

History

Founded in 1969 by Michael Gill, the airline originally operated as Gill Aviation, mainly providing cargo and mail flights for various companies including the British Royal Mail. Following the acquisition of passenger aircraft in June 1989, the airline changed its name to Gill Air. The arrival of Fokker 100 aircraft in 1995 resulted in the airline entering into a codeshare agreement with Air France between Newcastle upon Tyne and Paris-Charles de Gaulle airport. The title of Gill Airways was adopted in 1995, to reflect the growing importance of passenger operations to the airline.

Administration and closure
After emerging from administration in 2000, the airline seemed to have a promising future ahead of it. However, following the September 11, 2001 attacks, the principal financier, the Bank of Scotland, withdrew funding. The final day of operations was 20 September 2001, with the airline placed into liquidation and the loss of 240 jobs.

Revival and rebranding
On 1 September 2009, an application for a Civil Aviation Authority Type A Operating Licence was made by Gill Airways Ltd, of Birmingham. However, in early 2010, the company rebranded as Cello Aviation, which later ceased trading.

Fleet
Gill Airways used to have the following types of aircraft:
 ATR 42
 ATR 72
 BAe 146
 Fokker 100
 Shorts 330
 Shorts 360

Aircraft on display
 A Gill Airways Shorts 330 G-OGIL preserved in its original colours can be found at the North East Aircraft Museum, Sunderland, Tyne & Wear.

See also
 List of defunct airlines of the United Kingdom

References

External links

 Gill Airways (Archive)
 

Defunct airlines of the United Kingdom
Airlines established in 1995
Airlines disestablished in 2001